Barbara Fairchild is a  food journalist who was the editor-in-chief of Bon Appétit from 2000 until 2011.

Early life
Fairchild was born in 1951 in Queens, New York, to Robert P. Lieb and Ina Lieb.  Her father was Jewish and her mother was Lutheran. She moved to Los Angeles at a young age and grew up in Studio City.  She discovered her passion for food and cooking at a young age, and after graduating from California State University, Northridge in 1972 with a degree in journalism, she went to work first for radio station KGIL-AM as a news writer, then for Carte Blanche Magazine, and then later Bon Appetit in 1978 as an editorial assistant.

Career
Fairchild spent 32 years with Bon Appétit, culminating with her appointment as editor-in-chief in 2000. Since 2011 she has worked as a columnist, freelance food and travel writer, editor, public speaker, radio personality, and consultant.

Personal life
Fairchild's life partner is Paul Nagle.

Awards
Fairchild has been the recipient of numerous awards, including:
 Who's Who of Food and Beverage in America Inductee
 James Beard Foundation Award
 Society of Publication Designers Award

Publications
 The Bon Appétit Cookbook
 The Bon Appétit Fast Easy Fresh Cookbook
 The Bon Appétit Desserts Cookbook

References

American editors
Living people
Writers from New York City
1951 births
Bon Appétit people